Phryganodes is a genus of moths of the family Crambidae described by Achille Guenée in 1854.

Species
Phryganodes albipedalis Hampson, 1899
Phryganodes antongilensis (Mabille, 1900)
Phryganodes attenuata Hampson, 1899
Phryganodes biguttata Hampson, 1898
Phryganodes centralbalis Hampson, 1899
Phryganodes chrysalis Hampson, 1908
Phryganodes cupriflavalis Hampson, 1912
Phryganodes eradicalis Hampson, 1908
Phryganodes erebusalis (Hampson, 1898)
Phryganodes flocculentalis Hampson, 1899
Phryganodes hamiferalis Hampson, 1899
Phryganodes lanialis Hampson, 1899
Phryganodes lasiocnemis Hampson, 1912
Phryganodes leucogaster Hampson, 1912
Phryganodes lophophoralis Hampson, 1896
Phryganodes nesusalis (Walker, 1859)
Phryganodes pachycraspedalis Hampson, 1896
Phryganodes plicatalis Guenée, 1854
Phryganodes selenalis Caradja in Caradja & Meyrick, 1933
Phryganodes setifera Hampson, 1899
Phryganodes stygialis Hampson, 1912
Phryganodes tagiadalis Hampson, 1899
Phryganodes tetraplagalis Hampson, 1899
Phryganodes unitalis (Guenée, 1854)
Phryganodes unitinctalis Hampson, 1896
Phryganodes violitincta Rothschild, 1915

Former species
Phryganodes baratalis Holland, 1900
Phryganodes bistigmalis Strand, 1913

References

Spilomelinae
Crambidae genera
Taxa named by Achille Guenée